"Top Of The World" is a 2003 single by The Wildhearts.

Track listings
CD1:
"Top of the World" (written by Ginger)
"6:30 Onwards" (written by Ginger)
"Eager To Leave 'Er" (written by Ginger)

CD2:
"Top of the World" (written by Ginger)
"Hit It on the Head" (written by CJ)
"Top of the World" (Video)

CD3:
"Top of the World" (written by Ginger)
"Cheers" (TV show theme: "Where Everybody Knows Your Name" written by Portnoy/Angelo)
"L.T.D"  (written by Jon Poole)

The Wildhearts songs
2003 songs